is a city located in Niigata Prefecture, Japan. , the city had an estimated population of 25,971 in 10,270 households, and a population density of 194 persons per km².

Geography
Kamo is located in an inland region of north-central Niigata Prefecture. As the city name implies, the Kamo River flows through the city. The highest elevation is the summit of Mount Awagatake at 1292 meters. The city is located roughly halfway between the two larger cities of Nagaoka and Niigata.

Surrounding municipalities
Niigata Prefecture
Minami-ku, Niigata
Sanjō
Gosen
Tagami

Climate
Kamo has a Humid climate (Köppen Cfa) characterized by warm, wet summers and cold winters with heavy snowfall.  The average annual temperature in Kamo is 12.6 °C. The average annual rainfall is 1978 mm with September as the wettest month. The temperatures are highest on average in August, at around 25.9 °C, and lowest in January, at around 0.6 °C.

Demographics
Per Japanese census data, the population of Kamo has declined steadily over the past 50 years.

History
The area of present-day Kamo was part of ancient Echigo Province, and developed from the early Heian period as settlement associated with a branch of the Kamo Shrine in Kyoto from 794 AD. The town of Kamo was established within Kitakanbara District, Niigata with the establishment of the modern municipalities system on April 1, 1889. It was elevated to city status on March 10, 1954.

Government

Kano has a mayor-council form of government with a directly elected mayor and a unicameral city legislature of 18 members.

Economy
Kamo is traditionally associated with its production of kiri-tansu, a type of tansu chest-of-drawers made from paulownia wood. The city is also a centre for the manufacturing of electrical appliances and furniture,

Education

Colleges and universities
Niigata University of Management
Niigata Chuoh Junior College

Primary and secondary education
Kamo has six public elementary schools and five public middle schools operated by the city government. The city has three public high schools operated by the Niigata Prefectural Board of Education.

Transportation

Railway
 JR East -  Shin'etsu Main Line

Highway

Sister cities
Kamo maintains sister city ties with three cities:

 Ōshima, Japan (1968)
 Zibo, China friendship city since October 21, 1993
 Komsomolsk-on-Amur, Russia

Local attractions

Kamo is a popular place for small tour groups, especially for children in elementary school.  It is advertised as a "traditional town" and sometimes referred to as the Little Kyoto of the Hokuetsu region.  This is because it shares certain structural features with Kyoto, being surrounded on three sides by mountains and intersected by a river.  Kamo's most famous attraction is Kamoyama Park, which is home to the Aomi Jinja (Shrine) and many other sights, including a petting area for small squirrels which the town has regularly imported.  The Kamo River is also the site of many city events, including the Obon Festival in August and the Snow Camelia Festival in April.  The snow camelia is a symbol of Kamo and can be seen growing in many locations around the city.

Notable people from Kamo
Hirohiko Izumida (governor of Niigata Prefecture)
Makiko Kikuta (politician)
Kanako Higuchi (actress)
Shigeo Gochō (Photographer)
Nobuo Kawaguchi (football player)

References

External links

Official Website 

 
Cities in Niigata Prefecture